The 2022 F4 Danish Championship season was the sixth season of the F4 Danish Championship. The season began at Padborg Park in May and concluded at Jyllandsringen in October.

Teams and drivers 
All teams were Danish-registered.

Calendar 
All rounds, with the exception of the competition at Sturup Raceway in Sweden, were held in Denmark.

Race results

Championship standings 
Points were awarded to the top 10 classified finishers in each race. No points were awarded for pole position or fastest lap.

Drivers' standings 

 † – Driver did not finish the race, but was classified as they completed over 75% of the race distance.

Notes

References

External links 

 

F4 Danish Championship
Danish F4 Championship
F4 Danish Championship seasons
Danish